The second season of Australia's Greatest Athlete was broadcast on the Seven Network and hosted by Mark Beretta and Tom Williams, with Ricky Ponting presenting occasional fitness tips and interviews with the competitors in video packages. It was once again sponsored by Rexona, which had naming rights to the show.

Filming took place on Couran Cove Island Resort on South Stradbroke Island off the Gold Coast, Queensland.

Billy Slater, who won the first season of the show, returned to defend his title. By the end of the series, Slater had successfully defended his title by just 5 points, winning the title, trophy and $10,000 for the Royal Children's Hospital in Brisbane.

The season began on 6 February 2010 and aired at 4:30 pm on both Saturdays and Sundays, and concluded on 28 February 2010.

Participants

Matthew Mitcham – Olympic diving gold medallist
Jason Culina – A-League soccer player
Cameron Ling – Australian rules footballer
James O'Connor – Rugby Union player
Wendell Sailor – Rugby league and Rugby Union player
Craig Lowndes – V8 Supercar driver
Shannon Eckstein – Two-time world Ironman champion
Billy Slater – NRL player and series defending champion

Episodes

Episode 1
 Mini Iron-man Challenge
 Poles Challenge

Episode 2
 25 m Swimming Challenge
 Soccer Challenge

Episode 3
 Rugby Oztag Challenge
 Jet Ski Challenge

Episode 4
 40m Sprint
 Rock Climbing Challenge

Episode 5
 NRL Sled Push
 Bench Press Challenge

Episode 6
 Core Strength Challenge
 Kayaking Challenge

Episode 7
 V8 Buggy Challenge
 AFL Kick For Goal

Episode 8
Pinguet Challenges

Results table
The following table shows how many points each competitor earned throughout the series.

† indicates this event was the 'sports specific challenge' for this athlete
 The contestant won the challenge
 The contestant came second in the challenge
 The contestant came last in the challenge
 The contestant won the series
 The contestant came second overall in the series
 The contestant came last overall in the series

Trivia
 Matthew Mitcham and Cameron Ling were the only competitors not to have won an event.

References

External links
Official Website

2010 Australian television seasons